A brief chronology of the history of Tibet:

Chronology

See also 
 Timeline of the Tibetan Empire (7th to 9th century)
 Timeline of the Era of Fragmentation (9th to 13th century)

References

Citations

Sources 
 
 Karmay, Samten G. (1998). The Arrow and the Spindle, Studies in History, Myths, Rituals and Beliefs in Tibet. Revised edition 2009. Kathmandu, Nepal, Mandala Book Point. .

Further reading